Pieter Donker (1635 in Gouda – 1668 in Gouda), was a Dutch Golden Age painter.

Biography
According to Houbraken he travelled to Antwerp, Frankfurt, and Rome with his cousin Jan Donker. He travelled to Frankfurt, where he witnessed the coronation of Leopold, and accompanied Charles III de Créquy to Rome. 
According to the RKD he was a pupil of Jacob Jordaens in 1656–58 in Antwerp. In 1658, at the time of the coronation of Leopold I, Holy Roman Emperor he was a portraitist in Frankfurt.  His sketches of works by the Italian masters, were later used by Jan de Bisschop. 
In 1664 he travelled from Rome to Naples with Willem Schellinks, Alexander Le Petit, Frederick Kerseboom and G.Sabé. In 1666 he was back in Gouda, where he later died. His cousin Jan painted the regents of the Gouda corrections facility.

References

1635 births
1668 deaths
Dutch Golden Age painters
Dutch male painters
People from Gouda, South Holland